This is a list of Scottish National Party (SNP) Members of Parliament (MPs) elected to the House of Commons for the Fifty-Fifth Parliament of the United Kingdom (2010 to 2015).

It includes both MPs elected at the 2010 general election, held on 6 May 2010, and those subsequently elected in by-elections.

The list is sorted by the name of the MP.

MPs

See also
 Scottish National Party
 Results of the 2010 United Kingdom general election
 Members of the House of Lords
 List of MPs for Scotland
 List of MPs for constituencies in Scotland 2010–2015

 2010
Scottish National Party